Family with sequence similarity 87 member B is a protein that in humans is encoded by the FAM87B gene.

References

Further reading